Mark Sorenson (born 5 April 1979) is a former New Zealand rugby union player, his position of choice being a lock.

Sorenson joined Northampton from Newcastle Falcons in the summer of 2010, having previously joined the Falcons in the autumn of 2006 from New Zealand province Bay of Plenty, where he had been voted the team's best forward in the Air New Zealand Cup. He was a consistent performer at Kingston Park and won both the Supporters Club player of the season and the players' player of the season award in 2007/8.

On 14 February 2013, Sorensen left Northampton Saints to join Bristol Rugby in the RFU Championship for the 2013/14 season. In February 2016, he renewed his contract with Bristol for one more season. He is set to retire at the end of 2017.

References

External links
Newcastle Falcons profile
Saints sign Eustace and Sorenson
Northampton Saints profile

1979 births
Bay of Plenty rugby union players
Living people
New Zealand rugby union players
Newcastle Falcons players
Rugby union locks
Rugby union players from Wellington City